Tuğba Ekinci (born 9 June 1977) is a Turkish pop singer of Azerbaijani origin.

Discography

Albums 
 O Şimdi Asker (26 January 2005)
 Condom (14 April 2008)

EPs 
 Yanma Demezler (16 July 2010)
 100 Derece (3 August 2011)
 Hadi Kizim / Bi Kere Ara Be (25 September 2013)

Singles 
 "Boynuz" (11 June 2007)
 "Para Babası" (5 September 2016)
 "Türkiye'nin Aslanları" (22 March 2018)
 "Son Dakika" (3 July 2020)
 "Bende Maske Yok" (28 May 2022)

As a featured artist 
 "Bi' Gorsem" (feat. Tuğba Ekinci) – single (1 November 2011)

References

1976 births
People from Kars
Living people
Turkish-language singers
Turkish people of Azerbaijani descent